George Latimer may refer to:

 George Latimer (escaped slave) (1819–c. 1896), escaped slave whose case became a major political issue in Massachusetts
 George Latimer (Minnesota politician) (born 1935), mayor of St. Paul, Minnesota
 George Latimer (New York politician) (born 1953), New York State Senator and current Westchester County Executive
 George Latimer (Pennsylvania politician) (1750–1825), Speaker of the Pennsylvania House of Representatives
 George W. Latimer (1900–1990), Justice of the Utah Supreme Court